Vicki Adams (born May 13, 1951) is a ProRodeo Hall of Fame cowgirl.

Life
Vicki Adams was born Vicki Herrera on May 13, 1951, on the Yakima Indian Reservation in Toppenish, Washington. She is of mixed Native American heritage. Adams' mother was enrolled Yakama. Adams' ethnicity was Yakama, Snohomish, Puyllap, Cowlitz, Cayuse, and Umatilla. However, Adams choose Cowlitz to be enrolled. This was due to her great-great grandmother's mother being full blood Cowlitz. Her given Indian name is Le Yi Ah. This name means "women who sews fast".

Her father was a rodeo champion who taught his daughter rodeo. She was a barrel racer in an Indian association. She also performed trick riding. In 1969, she was an alternate Miss Indian America. At 18, she met and married Leon Adams.

Career
For five decades, Leon and Vicki were a team who entertained rodeo audiences with their roman riding, trick riding, dancing horses, and trained bulls. They performed throughout the United States and in some other countries. They resided in Stuart, Oklahoma. The Adams operated a 2,500 acre ranch in Stuart.

Both of them competed on the Professional Rodeo Cowboys Association, the top circuit in the United States. In 1982 Leon was awarded the PRCA Specialty Act of the Year; in 1984 Vicki received the award. After that, they both won the award in 1987 and 1997. For 19 straight years, they were nominated for the award.

Honors
Along with the ProRodeo Hall of Fame, Adams was inducted into the National Multicultural Western Heritage Museum and Hall of Fame in 2005. Adams was presented with the Tad Lucas Award from the National Cowboy and Western Heritage Museum in 2012.

Retirement and Leon's death
Leon retired from competition into 2005. Adams retired in 2006. Leon was inducted into the ProRodeo Hall of Fame in 2008 and died on October 30, 2017, in Stuart, Oklahoma.

References

External links 
 Women's Professional Rodeo Association
 Professional Rodeo Cowboys Association
 National Finals Rodeo
 Vicki Adams Tad Lucas Award 2012

1951 births
Living people
People from Toppenish, Washington
American barrel racers
Trick riding
American female equestrians
ProRodeo Hall of Fame inductees
Native American sportspeople
20th-century Native American women
20th-century Native Americans
21st-century Native American women
21st-century Native Americans